Mille Dinesen (born 17 March 1974) is a Danish actress best known for starring in the film Nynne (2005), as well as the title role in the television series Rita (2012–2020).

Mille Dinesen completed her acting education at the State Theatre School in 2004.

Filmography

Self
Gintbergs store aften - hver aften .... Herself - Actress (1 episode, 2005)
... aka Gintbergs store aften (Denmark: second season title)
Episode #2.31 (2005) TV episode .... Herself - Actress
Go' aften Danmark .... Herself - Actress (1 episode, 2005)
Episode dated 27 October 2005 (2005) TV episode .... Herself - Actress

References

External links

1974 births
Living people
21st-century Danish actresses
Danish film actresses
Danish television actresses